William N. Vander Loop (born December 6, 1932 in Little Chute, Wisconsin), During the Korean War, he served in the United States Army. He died at home on December 28, 2021. He was married with five children. was a member of the Wisconsin State Assembly for the 5th District.

Political career
Vander Loop was first elected to the Assembly in 1990. Additionally, he was a Kaukauna, Wisconsin alderman from 1983 to 1991. He was a Democrat.

References

1932 births
Living people
Democratic Party members of the Wisconsin State Assembly
Wisconsin city council members
Military personnel from Wisconsin
United States Army soldiers
United States Army personnel of the Korean War
People from Kaukauna, Wisconsin
People from Little Chute, Wisconsin